Harikumar Madhavan Nair is an Indian film audiographer and sound designer. He works in Hindi and Malayalam cinema. He has worked on numerous documentary films and has won 3 National Film Award for Best Non-Feature Film Audiography.

Style 
Hari prefers to use a distant microphone instead of a lapel microphone. He claims it offers a correct perspective relative to the visual image.

Partial filmography

References

External links 

Living people
Film and Television Institute of India alumni
People from Thiruvananthapuram district
Indian sound designers
Best Audiography National Film Award winners
Year of birth missing (living people)